Watertown is a town in Jefferson County, Wisconsin, United States. The population was 1,975 at the 2010 census. The unincorporated community of Ebenezer is located in the town.

Geography

Watertown is located at  (43.193066, −88.723774).

Demographics
As of the census of 2000, there were 1,876 people, 684 households, and 547 families residing in the town. The population density was 48.9 people per square mile (18.9/km2). There were 715 housing units at an average density of 18.6/sq mi (7.2/km2). The racial makeup of the town was 98.40% White, 0.27% African American, 0.11% Native American, 0.43% Asian, 0.48% from other races, and 0.32% from two or more races. Hispanic or Latino of any race were 1.33% of the population.

There were 684 households, out of which 33.2% had children under the age of 18 living with them, 70.9% were married couples living together, 5.0% had a female householder with no husband present, and 19.9% were non-families. 15.8% of all households were made up of individuals, and 6.9% had someone living alone who was 65 years of age or older. The average household size was 2.72 and the average family size was 3.03.

In the town, the population was spread out, with 24.8% under the age of 18, 7.7% from 18 to 24, 27.1% from 25 to 44, 29.2% from 45 to 64, and 11.1% who were 65 years of age or older. The median age was 39 years. For every 100 females, there were 105.0 males. For every 100 females age 18 and over, there were 109.0 males.

The median income for a household in the town was $52,667, and the median income for a family was $55,150. Males had a median income of $39,177 versus $25,027 for females. The per capita income for the town was $21,298. About 1.9% of families and 3.0% of the population were below the poverty line, including 1.2% of those under age 18 and 6.5% of those age 65 or over.

References

Towns in Jefferson County, Wisconsin
Watertown-Fort Atkinson
Towns in Wisconsin